Pseudoclavibacter soli is a Gram-positive, aerobic, rod-shaped and non-motile bacterium from the genus Pseudoclavibacter which has been isolated from soil from a ginseng field from Daejeon in Korea.

References

Microbacteriaceae
Bacteria described in 2009